Channel 103 is an independent local radio station broadcasting to the island of Jersey on 103.7 FM and DAB+ digital radio.

The station launched on 25 October 1992. Channel 103 is part of Tindle Radio, which also owns Island FM in Guernsey and Midlands 103 in Ireland.

According to RAJAR, the station has a weekly audience of 52,000 and a 29.1% market share as of December 2022 - the highest of any local radio station in the British Isles.

In late 2020, Channel 103 became a part of Bauer's Hits Radio Network for commercial sales. It remains owned by Tindle with no shared programming.

Programming

Channel 103's core audience is the 25-44 age group, playing contemporary hits - predominantly from the early 1990s to the present day.

News bulletins are presented locally from 6:30am until 6pm, Monday to Friday.

The station's weekend news service broadcasts local content, presented either from Jersey or Guernsey from 8am until noon. Sky News provides the service outside these times.

Transmission
From its launch in 1992 until 16 March 2021, Channel 103 broadcast from studios on Tunnell Street in St Helier.

In 2021, the station vacated its original building and moved to a new studio complex in Britannia Place, St Helier. It continues to transmit on FM from the Arqiva mast at Frémont Point, on the north coast of the island.

Channel 103 began digital radio transmissions, alongside those of Island FM, on 1 August 2021 with the launch of the local Ofcom-licensed DAB multiplex for the Channel Islands. This service is radiated from transmitters at Les Platons (Jersey) and Les Touillets (Guernsey) at launch, with a transmitter on Alderney to be added later in the summer.

External links
 Official site
 media.info

See also
BBC Radio Jersey
Contact 94

References

Radio stations in Jersey
Radio stations established in 1992
1992 establishments in Jersey